Blue Duck, sometimes referred to as Bluford Duck (1858–1895), was an outlaw of the American Old West, probably best known for a photograph taken of him in the mid-1880s, in which he posed with Belle Starr, a famous female outlaw.

Biography
Blue Duck was born in the Cherokee Nation, with the name of Sha-con-gah. By the early 1870s he was riding with gangs across the Oklahoma Territory committing armed robberies and acts of cattle rustling. Blue Duck became romantically involved with Belle Starr during that time. When she married outlaw Sam Starr, she and her husband formed their own gang, which Blue Duck joined. He is believed to have ridden with the gang through most of the latter part of the 1870s, although his involvement with them was off and on.

On June 23, 1884, while riding drunk in the Flint District of the Cherokee Nation, and in the company of outlaw William Christie, the two men came upon a farmer named Samuel Wyrick. For no apparent reason, the two outlaws opened fire on the farmer, emptying their revolvers into him and killing him. They then reloaded and fired on a young Cherokee boy who had witnessed the murder, missing him but shooting his horse from beneath him. Both Blue Duck and Christie were captured by Deputy US Marshal Frank Cochran, and taken before Judge Isaac Parker, known as the "Hanging Judge", in Fort Smith, Arkansas.

Both were convicted, although Christie was later cleared of the charge and released. Blue Duck was sentenced to hang, but later his sentence was reduced to life in prison. He was sent to Menard Penitentiary in Chester, Illinois, as Inmate #2486. Blue Duck was assisted in an unsuccessful appeal by Belle Starr. In 1895, when he was diagnosed with tuberculosis and given only a short time to live, he was granted a pardon and released. He died shortly thereafter in Catoosa, Oklahoma, where he is buried.

See also
Blue Duck (Lonesome Dove series)

References
Outlaws of the American West
Blue duck, Outlaw
Blue duck at Find A Grave

Outlaws of the American Old West
Cherokee Nation people (1794–1907)
1858 births
1895 deaths
19th-century Native Americans